The 1994 CONCACAF Cup Winners Cup was the third edition of this defunct tournament contended between 1991 and 1998.

Preliminary round

Caribbean Zone

First round

Second round

Bracket

Results

Quarterfinals

Semifinals

Third place

Final

Champion

References

2
CONCACAF Cup Winners Cup